Gunbalanya (also spelt Kunbarlanja, and historically referred to as Oenpelli) is an Aboriginal Australian town in west Arnhem Land in the Northern Territory of Australia, about  east of Darwin. The main language spoken in the community is Kunwinjku (a dialect of Bininj Kunwok). At the 2021 Australian census, Gunbalanya had a population of 1,177.

Only accessible by air in the wet season, Gunbalanya is known for its Aboriginal art, in particular rock art and bark painting. It has a range of services, including a police station, school and community arts centre, Injalak Arts.

It is the nearest town to the Awunbarna, also known as Mount Borradaile, an Aboriginal sacred site and the location of significant Indigenous Australian rock art.

Etymology and history
The area now known as Gunbalanya was originally called "Uwunbarlany" by Erre-speaking people, who were its original inhabitants. Oenpelli was the way Paddy Cahill (1863–1923), the founder of the original cattle station in the area, pronounced the local word. The present toponym is an anglisation of the word Kunbarlanja current in Kunwinjku, the language of the people who now live there, who began moving into the area from the east following the Cahill's establishment of his cattle station there in 1909.

Oenpelli, as it was known then, was established by the Rev. Alfred Dyer as a mission in 1925 by the Church of England's Church Missionary Society, on the former cattle station. Dyer and his wife Mary established a typical mission station, with church, school, dispensary, garden and store, to which they added pastoral work with feral cattle and horses.  Among those who attended the mission school was the celebrated Gagudju elder and interpreter of culture, Bill Neidjie.

The eldest son of the senior traditional owner of the land, Nipper Marakarra, Narlim, was born in 1909 and grew up at the mission. He continued to stay there as he wanted to have his children taught English, and also saw it as a way to stay on Country as traditional custodians. However, when a visiting policeman in the late 1930s found that Narlim had an infectious disease, he handcuffed him in order to chain him up with a group of others who were being sent to Darwin. Narlim was sent away under police escort, with his baby daughter on his shoulder. He never returned, but his daughter, Peggy did, and later became a community leader.

In 1933, Nell Harris, a young woman of 29 years old, was taught Kunwinkju by the local people, and, along with Hannah Mangiru and Rachel Maralngurra, translated the Gospel of Mark into the language.

Oenpelli remained a mission until 1975, when responsibility was transferred to an Aboriginal town council and the name was changed to Gunbalanya.

The 1948 American-Australian Scientific Expedition to Arnhem Land visited Oenpelli for three months and collected a large array of local artefacts, art, and specimens.

Use of the name Oenpelli
The large and uncommon Oenpelli python, Morelia oenpelliensis, shares the historic name of this community, as does Oenpelli bloodwood, Corymbia dunlopiana.

A geological event known as the Oenpelli Dolerite intrusive event occurred about 1,720 million years ago.

People and surrounds
The local people speak Kunwinjku (a dialect of Bininj Kunwok), and are a grouping of the Bininj peoples. At the 2016 Australian census, Gunbalanya had a population of 1,116. 88.6% of the population identified as Aboriginal and/or Torres Strait Islander.

Awunbarna is a sacred site and the location of a significant number of rock paintings. A study published in 2020 recording the Maliwawa Figures describes paintings at 87 sites across western Arnhem Land from Awunbarna westwards to the Wellington Range.

Access, facilities and tourism

The sealed Arnhem Highway links Darwin to Jabiru, the town within Kakadu National Park. About  before Jabiru, the sealed road turns off to Ubirr, the Border Store, Cahill's Crossing on the East Alligator River and Oenpelli. While this road is generally navigable by four-wheel drive vehicle, the river crossing is a causeway which is closed by flooding during the wet season (November to April) and at high tides.

Northern Land Council permits are required to cross the East Alligator River, the western boundary of Arnhem Land, and travel east to Gunbalanya, obtainable from offices in Darwin or Jabiru. These may take up to two weeks to finalise, and many visitors prefer to see Arnhem Land through an organised tour operation.

Oenpelli Airport is a sealed all weather airstrip located in Gunbalanya, and a number of companies offer charter flights to and from this airport.

The town is regarded as one of the major Aboriginal towns in Arnhem Land, and includes a school (pre-school to Year 12), health clinic, service station, police station, aged care, recreational clubs, community arts centre (Injalak Arts) and various stores.

The Stone Country Festival (formerly Gunbalanya Cultural Open Day) is usually held in August and access for this is allowed without permit. Though an annual event, it is sometimes not able to be organised in a given year.

The local radio station is called "RIBS" for Remote Indigenous Broadcasting Service.

Indigenous art

Rock art
Western Arnhem Land is home to some of the most significant rock art in the world.

Local artistic traditions are continued and adapted by the Injalak Arts Centre. Injalak Arts is named after nearby Injalak Hill, which has many rock art galleries and is the main tourist attraction in Gunbalanya.

Bark painting
In the 1960s the mission at Oenpelli encouraged traditional rock painting artists to paint on bark. These painted barks were sold to anthropologists and travellers. This soon became a cottage industry, and several important Aboriginal artists, including Lofty Bardayal, Mick Kubarrku and Dick Murramurra transferred their rock art skills to bark. These bark paintings are now held in art galleries in Australia and across the world.  Exhibitions of bark paintings include "Old Masters" at the National Museum of Australia and "Crossing Country" at the Art Gallery of New South Wales.

In film
Parts of the 2020 film High Ground was filmed in the area, and the story reflects some of the history of the region, including a fictionalised version of the Gan Gan massacre.

Climate

Notes and references

Notes

References

Further reading
 Birch, Bruce 'Erre Mengerrdji Urningangk: Three Languages From The Alligator Rivers Region Of North Western Arnhem Land, Northern Territory, Australia', Gundjeihmi Aboriginal Corporation, 2006
 Aboriginal Arts Board of the Australia Council, Oenpelli Bark Painting, Ure Smith, 1979
 Cole, Keith, A History of Oenpelli, Nungalinya Publications, 1975
 Cole, Keith, Arnhem Land: Places and People, Rigby, 1980

External links
 West Arnhem Regional Council
 Injalak Stone Country Arts and Crafts
 West Arnhem College Gunbalanya 
 Northern Land Council
 Kunwinjku language
 Online Kunwinjku dictionary

Aboriginal communities in the Northern Territory
Arnhem Land
Australian Aboriginal freehold title
Towns in the Northern Territory